Łukasz Matusiak (born 7 May 1985) is a Polish football coach and retired player.

Career

Club
In February 2011, he was released from Podbeskidzie Bielsko-Biała. After tests, he signed a contract with Polonia Bytom.

References

External links
 
 

1985 births
Living people
Polish footballers
Podbeskidzie Bielsko-Biała players
Polonia Bytom players
Tur Turek players
Zagłębie Sosnowiec players
GKS Tychy players
Ekstraklasa players
I liga players
II liga players
Place of birth missing (living people)
Association football midfielders
Polish football managers
I liga managers